Potassium ethyl xanthate (KEX) is an organosulfur compound with the chemical formula . It is a pale yellow powder that is used in the mining industry for the separation of ores. It is a potassium salt of ethyl xanthic acid.

Production and properties
Xanthate salts are prepared by the action of alkoxides on carbon disulfide. The alkoxide is often generated in situ from potassium hydroxide:

Potassium ethyl xanthate is a pale yellow powder that is stable at high pH, but rapidly hydrolyses below pH = 9:

Oxidation gives diethyl dixanthogen disulfide:

KEX is a source of ethylxanthate coordination complexes. For example  have been prepared from KEX for M = Cr, In, Co.

Applications
Potassium ethyl xanthate is used in the mining industry as flotation agent for extraction of the ores of copper, nickel, and silver. The method exploits the affinity of these "soft" metals for the organosulfur ligand.

Potassium xanthate is a useful reagent for preparing xanthate esters from alkyl and aryl halides. The resulting xanthate esters are useful intermediates in organic synthesis.

Safety
The LD50 is 103 mg/kg (oral, rats) for potassium ethyl xanthate.

References

Potassium compounds
Thiocarbonyl compounds
Metallurgical processes